Sri Aurobindo Mandir Annual was first published in Calcutta in 1942.  It was the first publication in which Savitri appeared in installments, in 1946 and 1947.

The Great Aranyaka, a translation and commentary on the first chapter, first Brahmana of the Brihadaranyaka Upanishad, appeared in the Sri Aurobindo Mandir Annual in 1953.

A number of Sri Aurobindo's early plays, dating from the Baroda period and the early period in Pondicherry, were also first published in it.  These include

 Rodogune was dated February 1906, just before Sri Aurobindo left Baroda for Bengal, and was published in Sri Aurobindo Mandir Annual, 1958, and also issued in book-form in the same year. 
 The Viziers of Bassora was written in Baroda, and later recovered from the Government Archives in 1951 along with other manuscripts which had been exhibits in the Alipore Conspiracy Case. This play was published in the Sri Aurobindo Mandir Annual in 1959, and also appeared in book form in the same year. 
 Eric was written in Pondicherry in 1912 or 1913; first published in Sri Aurobindo Mandir Annual, 1960, and also published as a book in the same year. 
 Prince of Edur was written in 1907, in the middle of the period of Sri Aurobindo's political activity. It is in complete as it has only three acts and not five.  It was published in Sri Aurobindo Mandir Annual, 1961. 
 The Maid in the Mill and The House of Brut are also both incomplete and belong to Sri Aurobindo's early Baroda period. They were printed in Sri Aurobindo Mandir Annual, 1962.

This material has since been republished in the Collected Works Of Sri Aurobindo, under Collected Plays Part I

Sri Aurobindo